Ancient Siam (also known as Ancient City, Mueang Boran) is a museum park constructed by Lek Viriyaphant and occupying over  in the  shape of Thailand.

Ancient Siam is dubbed as the world's largest outdoor museum. Close to the Crocodile Farm in Samut Prakan Province, the 320-hectare "city" features 116 structures of Thailand's famous monuments and architectural attractions. The grounds of Ancient Siam correspond roughly to the shape of the kingdom, with the monuments lying at their correct places geographically. Some of the buildings are life-size replicas of existing or former sites, while others are scaled down. Still others are "creative designs," and not replicas of any historical structure.

The replicas were constructed with the assistance of experts from the National Museum to ensure historical accuracy. Outstanding works include the former Grand Palace of Ayutthaya (destroyed in the Burmese invasion of 1767), Phimai Sanctuary in Nakhon Ratchasima, and Wat Khao Phra Viharn on the Cambodian border.

History 

Lek Viriyaphant was interested in art since childhood, which inspired him to establish the Ancient City. Initially, he intended to build a Thai map-shaped golf course where miniatures of important national ancient sites were placed, which aimed to serve tourism and education purposes only.

Lek started doing research on the establishment of the Ancient City. He found that many ancient sites had been left in decay. Thus, he changed the concept of the Ancient City from being a tourism attraction and relaxation to an open-air museum for education purpose to benefit newer generations who would be proud of their national heritage.

Lek continually created artwork in the Ancient City as well as the Sanctuary of Truth in Pattaya and the Erawan Museum in Samut Prakan until the end of his life on 17 November 2000.

Recent events 
In 2006, America's Next Top Model, Season 6, the reality show from the US, has led the contestants to the finals by using the Pavilion of the Saint as a runway. It was a model platform that was the largest in the show's history. In the area, Sanphet castle model was the place where the winner was announced.

On 29 September 2009, 500 activists from the People's Alliance for Democracy (PAD) protested at the model of the Preah Vihear Temple in Ancient Siam. They claimed that the temple belonged to Thailand although the International Court of Justice (ICJ) in The Hague had ruled in 1962 that the temple belonged to Cambodia.

Architecture by timeline 

The Ancient City displays significant architectural achievements from different eras. They are arranged chronologically.

 Pre-historical
 Dvaravati (11th – 16th centuries BE)
 Srivichaya (13th – 18th BE)
 Khmer or Ancient Khmer (16th – 18th BE)
 Lanna (16th – 25th BE)
 Lan Chang (16th – 21st BE)
 Hariphunchai (17th – 19th BE)
 Sukhothai (17th – 20th BE)
 Authong (17th – 20th BE)
 Ayutthaya (19th – 24th BE)
 Thonburi (24th BE)
 Rattanakosin (25th BE)

List of replicas

See also
Sanctuary of Truth
Erawan Museum
List of museums in Thailand
List of museums and art galleries in Bangkok

References

Further reading
Muang Boran, In the Ancient City (Bangkok: Muang Boran Publishing House, 1980).
Muang Boran, Muang Boran: A Nostalgic Look (Bangkok: Muang Boran Publishing House, 1988).
Penny Van Esterik, Materializing Thailand (Oxford: Berg, 2000), pp. 114–118.
ยุคสมัยทางศิลปะ. (n.d.). Retrieved February 3, 2017, from http://ancientcitygroup.net/ancientsiam/th/historical-timeline/
About us. (n.d.). Retrieved February 3, 2017, from http://ancientcitygroup.net/ancientsiam/th/acontent/21.html

Visionary environments
Museums in Thailand
Buildings and structures in Samut Prakan province
Tourist attractions in Samut Prakan province
History museums in Thailand
Open-air museums in Thailand